The Buffalo mayoral election of 1989 took place on November 4, 1989 and resulted in incumbent mayor Jimmy Griffin winning his last term as mayor against two other opponents.

References

1989 New York (state) elections
Buffalo
Mayoral elections in Buffalo, New York